Karrakatta Cemetery is a metropolitan cemetery in the suburb of Karrakatta in Perth, Western Australia.  Karrakatta Cemetery first opened for burials in 1899, the first being that of wheelwright Robert Creighton. Managed by the Metropolitan Cemeteries Board, the cemetery attracts more than one million visitors each year. Cypress trees located near the main entrance are a hallmark of Karrakatta Cemetery. The cemetery contains a crematorium, and in 1995 Western Australia's first mausoleum opened at the site.

The entrance (known as the Waiting House) includes a structure designed by George Temple-Poole.

Redevelopment 
Since 1969, a redevelopment program known as ‘Cemetery Renewal’ has been undertaken at Karrakatta Cemetery. This process involves the removal of headstones and grave surrounds, including plot markers. The headstones are either put elsewhere in a garden, plastered on limestone walls, taken by family or, if deemed to be damaged, destroyed. The new burials will have a headstone on the grave, but no marker is left behind to memorialise the old burials. Under the current policy, no remains are disturbed.

Across all cemeteries in Western Australia, the tenure on graves is 25 years – whether for burials, ashes or mausoleum crypts. There is an automatic right to purchase a further 25 years, totalling 50 years. After that, renewal of Grants of Right of Burial is at the cemetery authority’s discretion. All 50, 99-year and perpetual Grants were extinguished on 2 July 2012 due to a provision of the Cemeteries Act 1986. Once a Grant expires, control of the grave reverts to the cemetery authority.

Notable people
Notable people interred within Karrakatta Cemetery include:
 William Baldwin, New Zealand politician
 Jean Beadle, Australian feminist, social worker, and Labor Party member
 Simon Cain, actor, horse breeder and Aboriginal art gallery owner
 Edith Cowan, social reformer, first Australian woman to serve as a member of parliament
 Elsie Curtin, wife of John Curtin
 John Curtin, 14th Prime Minister of Australia
 Sir John Dwyer KCMG, Chief Justice, Lieutenant-Governor, buried with Lady Emily Louise Dwyer.
 Sir John Forrest, 1st Premier of Western Australia
 Joseph Furphy, author
 Dame Alexandra Hasluck, author and wife of Paul Hasluck
 Sir Paul Hasluck, 17th Governor-General of Australia and politician
 Heath Ledger, actor (ashes)
 Matthew Locke, soldier (ashes)
 Paul McGinness, co-founder of Qantas Airways
 Monty Miller, trade unionist
 John Scaddan, 10th Premier of Western Australia
 William Stratton, Chief of Air Staff (1969–1971), Royal New Zealand Air Force
 A. O. Neville, the first Chief Protector of Aborigines
 James del Piano, businessman, Italian diaspora aficionado
 J. W. Sutherland (1870–1946), mining engineer and metallurgist in Western Australia
 Frederick Vosper, Australian newspaper journalist, proprietor, and politician
 Edward Wittenoom, Australian politician
 Jessie Argyle, an Aboriginal Western Australian woman who led a community space for Aboriginal people.

There are also ten Victoria Cross recipients who are interred in Karrakatta Cemetery:
 Thomas Axford
 John Carroll
 Sir Hughie Edwards
 Robert Gee
 James Heather Gordon
 George Julian Howell
 Martin O'Meara
 Clifford Sadlier
 Hugo Throssell
 James Park Woods

War graves
, Karrakatta Cemetery contains the graves of 111 Commonwealth service personnel of World War I and 141 of World War II, besides a Dutch naval sailor of the latter war, divided between the cemetery's various denominational plots.

The Commonwealth War Graves Commission (CWGC) has a memorial to 15 Australian service personnel2 sailors, 9 soldiers, 4 airmenwho died in World War II and were cremated at Karrakatta Crematorium. In addition, 7 Australian personnel of the same war2 sailors, 4 soldiers, 1 airmanwho were cremated at Karrakatta Crematorium but whose ashes had been scattered or buried at places where CWGC commemoration was not possible are listed by name on the Western Australia Cremation Memorial at the separate Perth War Cemetery.

See also
 Burials at Karrakatta Cemetery
 East Perth Cemeteries

References

External links
 
 Karrakatta CemeteryBillion Graves
 

Cemeteries in Western Australia
1899 establishments in Australia
Karrakatta, Western Australia
Commonwealth War Graves Commission cemeteries in Australia